Laura Campos (born  in Mérida, Extremadura) is a Spanish female artistic gymnast, representing her nation at international competitions.  

She participated at the 2004 Summer Olympics and at the 2008 Summer Olympics in Beijing, China.

References

External links

1988 births
Living people
Spanish female artistic gymnasts
Place of birth missing (living people)
Olympic gymnasts of Spain
Gymnasts at the 2008 Summer Olympics
Gymnasts at the 2004 Summer Olympics
21st-century Spanish women